"Sway" is a song by New Zealand singer Bic Runga. It was released as the second single from her debut studio album, Drive (1997), in 1997. The song peaked at  7 in New Zealand and No. 10 in Australia, earning gold certifications in both countries. At the 32nd New Zealand Music Awards, the song won three awards: Single of the Year, Best Songwriter, and Best Engineer (Simon Sheridan). In 2001, it was voted the 6th best New Zealand song of all time by members of APRA. A music video directed by John Taft was made for the song.

An acoustic version of the song can be found on the charity album Even Better than the Real Thing Vol. 2. In September 2019, Runga re-recorded the song for Waiata / Anthems, a collection of re-recorded New Zealand pop songs to promote te Wiki o te Reo Māori (Māori Language Week). The new version, retitled "Haere Mai Rā / Sway", featured lyrics reinterpreted by scholar Tīmoti Kāretu.

In June 2022, R3hab and Amy Shark released a cover titled "Sway My Way".

Background
Bic Runga wrote the song in Ireland. While she was on her way to the airport before her trip, she saw a bridge with graffiti on it. One of the words painted on the bridge was "sway". Although Runga did not understand the circumstances in which this word appeared on the bridge, she decided to give her next song the same title.

Commercial performance
In New Zealand, "Sway" debuted at number 28 on the RIANZ Singles Chart, then climbed into the top 10 five weeks later, eventually peaking at number seven on 13 July 1997. The song spent a total of 17 weeks on the chart and left the top 50 on 14 September 1997. "Sway" was certified gold in New Zealand with 5,000 copies sold. In Australia, "Sway" debuted on the ARIA Singles Chart at number 42, peaked at number 10, and spent a total of 22 weeks on the chart. The Australian Recording Industry Association (ARIA) certified the song gold, denoting shipments of 35,000 units. In 2004, the single charted in Ireland and the United Kingdom. In the former country, the song first appeared on the Irish Singles Chart on 16 September 2004 and peaked at number 26. In the United Kingdom, "Sway" stayed on the UK Singles Chart for a single week, peaking at number 83.

Track listings

New Zealand CD and cassette single 
 "Sway" – 4:14
 "I Don't Mean It" – 3:18
 "Lonely Lola Cherry Cola Girl" – 3:56

Australian CD single 
 "Sway"
 "Dust"
 "Close the Door, Put Out the Light"

UK CD single 
 "Sway" – 4:22
 "Welcome to My Kitchen" – 4:01
 "Close the Door, Put Out the Light" – 2:37

Irish CD single 
 "Sway" – 4:22
 "She Left on a Monday" – 4:45

Credits and personnel
Credits are lifted from the Drive album booklet.

Studios
 Recorded at Revolver Studios (Auckland, New Zealand)
 Mixed at Brooklyn Recording Studios (Los Angeles)
 Mastered at A&M Mastering (Los Angeles)

Personnel

 Bic Runga – writing, vocals, backing vocals, xylophone, production, arrangement
 Gary Verberne – guitars
 Andrew Thorne – guitars
 Aaron McDonald – bass
 Wayne Bell – drums
 Kate Walshe – violin
 Sally-Anne Brown – cello
 Duncan Haynes – string arrangement
 Matt Wallace – mixing, mastering
 Tom Banghart – mixing assistance
 Simon Sheridan – engineering
 Matt Tait – engineering assistance

Charts

Weekly charts

Year-end charts

Certifications

Release history

"Sway My Way"

In June 2022, Dutch producer R3hab and Australian singer Amy Shark released a version titled "Sway My Way". It peaked at number 25 on the ARIA Singles Chart and was certified gold.

Speaking about the recording, R3hab said "Every record reveals a new facet of the artist behind it, 'Sway My Way' might surprise some listeners, as it's got a more organic and stripped-back feel than many of my singles, but I love the dynamic it brings. Amy is an incredible artist and a pleasure to work with, and I'm so glad she helped me bring this song to life." Shark said, "I grew up loving Bic Runga, and her song 'Sway' was one that I loved so much. When R3hab asked me to join him and put my spin on the song, I jumped at it."

Reception
Conor Lochrie from Rolling Stone Australia felt that "The pair dovetail well on the collaboration, with Shark's emotive vocals paying homage to the original over R3HAb's laidback electronic instrumental."

Track listing
 "Sway My Way" – 2:16
 "Sway My Way" (Karim Nass remix) – 2:18

Charts

Certifications

References

1997 singles
2022 singles
1997 songs
APRA Award winners
Bic Runga songs
R3hab songs
Amy Shark songs
Columbia Records singles
Epic Records singles
Songs written by Bic Runga
Sony Music singles